Prasthanatrayi, literally, three sources (or axioms), refers to the three canonical texts of theology having epistemic authority, especially of the Vedanta schools. It consists of:

The Upanishads consist of ten, twelve or thirteen major texts, with a total of 108 texts (some scholars list ten as principal – the Mukhya Upanishads, while most consider twelve or thirteen as principal, most important Upanishads). The ten Upanishads are Īśā, Kena, Kaṭha, Praṣna, Muṇḍaka, Māṇḍūkya, Taittirīya, Aitareya, Chāndogya and Bṛhadāraṇyaka.   

Founders of the major schools of Vedanta, Adi Shankara, Madhvācharya wrote  (commentaries) on these texts. Rāmānujāchārya  did not write any  (commentary) on the Upanishads, but wrote  (commentaries) on Brahma Sutras and Bhagavad Gita. Even though Ramanuja did not write individual commentaries on principal Upanishads, he included many hundreds of quotations from Upanishads in his Sri Bhasya. In the Ramanuja lineage, one of his followers, Rangaramanuja, wrote commentaries on almost all of the Principal Upanishads around the 1600s. Vallabhacharya and Nimbarkacharya wrote  (commentaries) on Brahma Sutras and Bhagavad Gita but they did not write commentaries on Upanishads. Like Ramanuja, they quoted many verses from Upanishads in their works.

See also
 Vedanta
 Hindu philosophy
Mukhya Upanishads
 
 Śāstra pramāṇam in Hinduism
Veda Vyas

Suddhadwait
Vallabhacharyaji Mahaprabhu

References

Notes 

  
  

Vedanta